Leonard Graham (20 August 1901 – 21 December 1962) was an English footballer and first-class cricketer.

Football career 
Graham made over 300 appearances in the Football League for Millwall. He won two caps for England at international level and also represented the Football League XI.

Cricket career 
Graham was a right-handed batsman who played first-class cricket for Essex. A lower-order batsman, Graham made two appearances for Essex during the 1926 season, scoring a total of 14 runs.

Coaching 
In 1935, he replaced Syd Puddefoot as an FA instructor to Kent Secondary Schoolboys.

References

External links
Leonard Graham at Cricket Archive

1901 births
1962 deaths
English cricketers
Essex cricketers
English footballers
English Football League players
Footballers from Leyton
Association football wing halves
Millwall F.C. players
Leytonstone F.C. players
Isthmian League players
England international footballers
English Football League representative players